Peach Panther is the second studio album by American rapper Riff Raff. The album was released on June 24, 2016, by Neon Nation Corporation and BMG Rights Management with distribution handled by Warner Music.

Track listing

Charts

References

2016 albums
Albums produced by FKi (production team)